Vinh International Airport  is located in Vinh city of Nghệ An Province in northern Vietnam. It is a mixed military/civil airport. It used to be one of the two major military airbases in Vietnam besides Gia Lam Airbase in Hanoi.

During 2002–2015, the airport saw the annual increase of passengers of 43.89%, the highest rate out of all airports in Vietnam. The airport served 1.8 million passengers in 2018.

History
The airport was built by the French in 1937, at first included a  landing strip, aprons and fuel storage. In 1994, Vietnamese government invested 20 billion VND to renovate the airport to receive commercial flights. In 1995, Hanoi - Vinh - Da Nang flight route was inaugurated.

During 2001 — 2003, the airport saw a major upgrade to its infrastructure.

A new passenger terminal was constructed in 2014 and opened in 2015, serving domestic flights. The old terminal was then converted to a temporary international terminal. In 2019, renovations to the old terminal were completed for it to be fully capable of handling international flights and bigger aircraft.

International flights
International services at the airport commenced in 2014 with scheduled flights by Vietnam Airlines to Vientiane, Laos using ATR 72 airplanes. Despite a strong demand on road between Vinh and Vientiane with up to 180,000 people passing through border ports in Nghe An province annually, the air service only saw 50% load factor against a 10,000-seat annual capacity. Vietnam Airlines reported a $750,000 loss on the route in 2014. The route was ended on October 25, 2015.

In June 2016, Vietnamese travel agency Vietravel introduced charter service between Vinh and Bangkok, Thailand using Airbus A320 and A321 but the service was ended by June 2017 due to insufficient infrastructure at Vinh Airport. The service was reintroduced in February 2019 when the renovated international terminal at the airport was inaugurated.

Facilities

A new terminal with designed capacity of 3 million passengers per year and estimated cost of 800 billion VND (around $37.65 million) was opened in 2015.

Airlines and destinations

Statistics

See also

 List of airports in Vietnam
 Gia Lam Airbase

References

External links

 Vinh International Airport

1937 establishments in Vietnam
Airports established in 1937
Airports in Vietnam
Buildings and structures in Nghệ An province
Vinh